Clanis is a genus of moths in the family Sphingidae erected by Jacob Hübner in 1819.

Species
Clanis baratana Brechlin, 1998
Clanis bilineata (Walker 1866)
Clanis deucalion (Walker 1856)
Clanis euroa Rothschild & Jordan 1903
Clanis hyperion Cadiou & Kitching 1990
Clanis mahadeva Gehlen, 1935
Clanis mcguirei Eitschberger, 2004
Clanis negritensis Hoegenes & Treadaway 1993
Clanis orhanti Haxaire, 2001
Clanis peterseni Eitschberger, 2004
Clanis phalaris (Cramer 1777)
Clanis pratti Joicey & Talbot 1921
Clanis schwartzi Cadio 1993
Clanis stenosema Rothschild & Jordan 1907
Clanis surigaoensis Clark 1928
Clanis thailandica Eitschberger, 2004
Clanis titan Rothschild & Jordan 1903
Clanis undulosa Moore 1879

Gallery

References

 
Smerinthini
Moth genera
Taxa named by Jacob Hübner